El Adalid was a Catholic weekly newspaper published from Torrelavega, Spain, between 1906 and 1917.

History and profile
The first issue of El Adalid was published on 19 March 1906 and was directed by Ceferino Calderón. 

The newspaper was the most militant Catholic publication in Cantabria. El Adalid had a traditionalist editorial line, and denounced liberalism as 'the banner of Lucifer'. The Catholic Electoral Centre was formed around El Adalid and the newspaper was an important cornerstone in the campaign to elect José María Gutiérrez Calderón as provincial deputy in its year of foundation.

El Besaya (published 1918-1919) was launched as a substitute to El Adalid. However, El Besaya had a more modernist approach that El Adalid.

References

1906 establishments in Spain
1917 disestablishments in Spain
Defunct newspapers published in Spain
Defunct weekly newspapers
Mass media in Torrelavega
Weekly newspapers published in Spain
Newspapers established in 1906
Publications disestablished in 1917
Catholic newspapers
Spanish-language newspapers